Hackberry may refer to:

Botany 
 Celtis, genus of deciduous trees known as hackberries
 Prunus padus, a species of cherry tree

Entomology 
 a number of brush-footed butterflies in the genus Asterocampa:
 Hackberry butterfly, Asterocampa celtis
 Desert hackberry butterfly, Asterocampa leilia

Places in the United States 
 Hackberry, Arizona
 Hackberry, Louisiana
 Hackberry, Kansas
 Hackberry High School, located in Hackberry, Louisiana
 Hackberry, Texas, in Denton County
 Hackberry (Lavaca County), Texas
 Hackberry Group, a geological formation in Iowa,
 Hackberry Group, a cluster of ruins in Hovenweep National Monument
 Hackberry Hill, Colorado
 Hackberry Mountain, California
 Hackberry School District, Arizona

Other uses 
 USS Hackberry (AN-25), a 1941 Aloe-class net laying ship

See also 
 

Animal common name disambiguation pages